The Ken Galluccio Cup is the European field lacrosse championship club competition. Organised by the European Lacrosse Federation, it is contested by the champions from European lacrosse leagues.

History
The idea of the competition was conceived by Kenneth Galluccio, one of the first ambassadors of lacrosse in Germany. The first edition, played in 2008 in Hamburg, Germany, was contested by five clubs. English team Wilmslow Lacrosse Club claimed the title.

After the death of Galluccio in February 2009 the tournament was suspended for a year. The tournament returned in 2010 renaming the championship in his honour. In this edition, Stockport defeated Wilmslow in the all-English final.

Since 2013, it is played in Ghent, Belgium.

Finals

Performances

By club

By country

Performance review
This table shows the comparison of the performances of all of the clubs that participated in the Ken Galluccio Cup.

Classification

Performance

References

External links
Official website
Results since 2013 at Pointbench.com

 
Lacrosse in Europe
2008 establishments in Europe
Recurring sporting events established in 2008
Multi-national professional sports leagues